The Union Church of Northeast Harbor is a historic church at 21 Summit Road in Northeast Harbor, Maine.  Designed by Peabody and Stearns and built in 1887, it is a notable local example of Shingle style architecture.  It was listed on the National Register of Historic Places in 1998.  The congregation is affiliated with the United Church of Christ.

Description and history
The Union Church is set on the northeast side of Summit Road, just north of its junction with Joy Road in a residential area of Northeast Harbor.  It is a cruciform structure, built out of stone and wood.  Most of the structure is built out of glacial till, with dressed granite corner quoins and stone buttresses.  The end of the transept is finished in vertical board-and-batten siding, and the roof is finished in wood shingles.  A squat stone tower rises above the southeastern end of the building.  The street-facing facade of the church presents its long axis, with the long nave to the left, and the main entrance just to the right of the south transept, sheltered by a buttressed porch.

The church congregation was established in 1883, at first meeting in a local school.  In 1886, the congregation, a mix of summer and full-time residents, formally organized and acquired the land for the building.  The noted Boston firm of Peabody and Stearns, one of New England's leading architectural firms of the period, designed the building, which was completed in 1887.  The firm was also responsible for alterations to the transept gable ends made in 1913.  This church was highlighted among those built along Maine's seacoast for its particularly organic appearance in relationship to its surroundings.

See also
National Register of Historic Places listings in Hancock County, Maine

References

External links
United Church of Christ, Northeast Harbor web site

Churches in Hancock County, Maine
Churches on the National Register of Historic Places in Maine
Churches completed in 1887
19th-century churches in the United States
Shingle Style church buildings
National Register of Historic Places in Hancock County, Maine
Shingle Style architecture in Maine